Roger Ernest Morgan (born 14 November 1946) is an English former footballer who played as a winger in the Football League for Queens Park Rangers and Tottenham Hotspur.

Career
Born in Walthamstow, London, Morgan came through the ranks at Queens Park Rangers to make his debut in a 2–2 draw against Gillingham on 3 October 1964. He scored QPR's first ever goal at Wembley, their first goal in the 1967 Football League Cup Final against West Bromwich Albion, which QPR won 3–2 with further goals from Rodney Marsh and Mark Lazarus to overturn a two-goal deficit.

In total, Morgan played 180 league games for QPR scoring 39 goals before joining Tottenham Hotspur in 1969. Injury forced his early retirement in 1973.

He spent 18 years at West Ham United as Football in the Community Manager. Roger Morgan coached David Beckham as a youngster.

Morgan's identical twin brother Ian also played for QPR. They adopted different hairstyles in order to tell them apart when playing in the same team.

References

1946 births
Living people
British identical twins
Footballers from Walthamstow
English footballers
England under-23 international footballers
Association football midfielders
English Football League players
Queens Park Rangers F.C. players
Tottenham Hotspur F.C. players
English football managers
West Ham United L.F.C. managers
West Ham United F.C. non-playing staff
Twin sportspeople
English twins